Michael Anthony Beach (born October 30, 1963) is an American actor. He has appeared in films Lean on Me (1989), One False Move (1992), Short Cuts (1993), Waiting to Exhale (1995), A Family Thing (1996), Soul Food (1997), and Aquaman (2018). On television, he played Al Boulet on the NBC medical drama ER from 1995 to 1997. From 1999 to 2005, Beach was a regular cast member in another NBC drama series, Third Watch, as Monte Parker, and as T.O. Cross in FX's Sons of Anarchy.

Early life
Beach was born in Roxbury, Massachusetts on October 30, 1963. He graduated from Juilliard School with a degree for the Bachelor of Fine Arts.

Career
Beach's big screen debut was in End of the Line in 1987, and he went on to appear opposite Morgan Freeman and Beverly Todd in Lean on Me (1989). Beach also co-starred in films including Internal Affairs, Cadence (both 1990), One False Move (1992) with Cynda Williams, Short Cuts and True Romance (both 1993).

Beach's big break came in 1995, playing Angela Bassett's unfaithful husband in the comedy-drama film Waiting to Exhale. In 1997, he played Vanessa L. Williams's unfaithful husband in the comedy-drama film Soul Food. On television, he played a recurring role as Al Boulet, the ex-husband of physician assistant Jeanie Boulet (Gloria Reuben) in the NBC medical drama ER from 1995 to 1997. From 1999 to 2005, Beach was a regular cast member in the NBC drama series Third Watch, playing FDNY paramedic Monte 'Doc' Parker.

Beach has had guest-starring roles on Law & Order, Law & Order: Special Victims Unit, Brothers & Sisters, Criminal Minds, Grey's Anatomy, The Closer, and The Blacklist. He was also a regular on the short-lived NBC series Crisis in 2014, and had recurring roles on Stargate Atlantis, Sons of Anarchy, The Client List, The Game, Secrets and Lies, S.W.A.T. and The 100. Most recently he has had a guest-starring role in seasons 6 and 7 of Chicago P.D. as Darius Walker, a drug dealer and community philanthropist turned confidential informant. In December 2022, Beach was confirmed by Deadline Hollywood to have signed on to appear in Saw X, the upcoming tenth installment of the Saw film series, set for release in October 2023.

Personal life
Beach married Tracey Beach in 1998, and their marriage lasted for eight years until their divorce in 2006. The following year, he was married to Elisha Wilson.

Filmography

Film and TV movies

Television

Video games

References

External links

1963 births
20th-century African-American people
21st-century African-American people
Living people
American male film actors
People from Roxbury, Boston
Male actors from Boston
American male voice actors
African-American male actors
American male television actors
20th-century American male actors
21st-century American male actors
Noble and Greenough School alumni